The 1964 European Figure Skating Championships were held in Grenoble, France from January 14 to 18. Elite senior-level figure skaters from European ISU member nations competed for the title of European Champion in the disciplines of men's singles, ladies' singles, pair skating, and ice dancing.

Results

Men

Ladies

Pairs

Ice dancing

References

External links
 results

European Figure Skating Championships, 1964
European Figure Skating Championships, 1964
European Figure Skating Championships
International figure skating competitions hosted by France
Sports competitions in Grenoble
20th century in Grenoble
European Figure Skating Championships